The Paracatu River is located mainly in the state of Minas Gerais in Brazil.  It is the longest tributary of the São Francisco, draining a basin of about 45,000 km2, including 21 municipalities and the Federal District.  The basin is almost completely located in the state of Minas Gerais (19 municipalities), including only three municipalities in the state of Goiás.

Its main tributary, the Preto, has its source in Lagoa Feia near Formosa in the state of Goiás and it forms the boundary with the Federal District.

References

Rivers of Minas Gerais
Rivers of Goiás